Stigmatomma pluto is a species of ant in the subfamily Amblyoponinae.
The species was first described as Amblyopone pluto by Gotwald and Levieux in 1972 and moved to the genus Stigmatomma in 2012.

Stigmatomma pluto is endemic to the unburned savannas of central Ivory Coast.

References

External links

 at antwiki.org

Amblyoponinae
Insects described in 1972
Endemic fauna of Ivory Coast
Hymenoptera of Africa